Dr. Know may refer to:

Dr. Know (band), a punk band from Oxnard, California
Dr. Know (guitarist) (born 1958), stage name of guitar player Gary Miller from the band Bad Brains
Dr. Know (TV series), a TV program on the Discovery Health Channel
Dr. Know, a commercial information service in the film Artificial Intelligence: A.I.

See also
Dr. No (disambiguation)